Rani Hamid (born 14 July 1944) is a Bangladeshi chess player who became the country's first Woman International Master in 1985. She has become the national champion a total of 20 times. She is the current national champion crowned on the 38th Women National Championship at the age of 75. She won her 20th National Women's Chess Championship title on September, 2019. She is also a three-time winner of the British Women's Chess Championship.
She became Zonal Champion in 2018, got the Journalists Choice Award in Chess World Cup 2018 in Russia
and won Gold Medal in Commonwealth Chess 2017 in Delhi.

Early life and career

Hamid was born Sayeda Jasimunnessa Khatun in Sylhet in 1944. She started playing chess at the age of 34. She was awarded the FIDE Woman International Master (WIM) title in 1985.

Hamid won the national title for six consecutive years from 1979 to 1984 among her total 19 titles. This is the most Bangladeshi Women's Championship titles by a wide margin. She has won the British Women's Championship in 1983, 1985 and 1989.

Hamid at the age of 75 has won her 20th Bangladesh National Women's title in September, 2019. She started to play chess at the age of 34 and became the country's first FIDE Woman International Master in 1985. By that time, she already won her first national championship in 1979. Starting from 1984, Rani Hamid played in all World Chess Olympiads (3 times in the general team).

Hamid was the Zonal Champion at 2018. Rani Hamid won the "Journalists Choice Award" in World Cup 2018, Russia. She achieved gold medal in
Commonwealth Chess 2017 in Delhi.

Personal life
Hamid was married to Lieutenant colonel MA Hamid, a sports organiser, from 1959 to 2008 (his death). Their son Kaiser Hamid is a former football player for Mohammedan Sporting Club and the captain of Bangladesh national football team during the 1980s and 1990s. Her other son, Sohel Hamid, was a national squash champion. Her youngest son, Shajahan Hamid Bobby (d. 2022), was a national handball player and a first division football league player. Her daughter is Jabin Hamid.

References

External links
 
 
 
 

1944 births
Living people
People from Sylhet
Bangladeshi female chess players
Chess Woman International Masters
Chess players at the 2010 Asian Games
Asian Games competitors for Bangladesh